Cash for Life may refer to:

Cash for Life, a game produced by the Ontario Lottery and Gaming Corporation
Cash for Life, a game produced by the Michigan Lottery
Cash4Life, a game offered by eight U.S. lotteries